Jon Hill may refer to:

Jon Michael Hill (born 1985), American actor
Jon Hill (chef) (born 1954), American chef
Jon A. Hill, United States Navy admiral
Jon Hill (footballer) (active 1997–2002), British footballer, see List of Hereford United F.C. players

See also 
John Hill (disambiguation)
Jonathan Hill (disambiguation)
Jonny Hill (rugby union) (born 1994), English rugby union player
Hill (surname)